The South Africa women's cricket team toured New Zealand in 1998–99, playing three women's One Day Internationals.  New Zealand whitewashed the series 3–0.

One Day International series

1st ODI

2nd ODI

3rd ODI

Tour matches

50-over matches: South Africa women v New Zealand A women

References

1999 in South African cricket
1999 in New Zealand cricket
Women 1998-99
South Africa 1999
International cricket competitions from 1997–98 to 2000
New Zealand
cricket
cricket
1999 in women's cricket
February 1999 sports events in New Zealand